"You Are My Sunshine" is a popular song. 

You Are My Sunshine may also refer to:

Films
You Are My Sunshine (2005 film), a South Korean film
You Are My Sunshine (2015 film), a Chinese film

Music
You Are My Sunshine (Copeland album)
You Are My Sunshine (Elizabeth Mitchell album)

Television
"You Are My Sunshine" (Miracles), an episode of the American television series Miracles
"You Are My Sunshine", season 6, episode 12 of Sons of Anarchy

See also
"You're My Sunshine", a song by Namie Amuro